Marie Bell (23 December 1900 – 14 August 1985), born Marie-Jeanne Bellon-Downey, was a French tragedian, comic actor and stage director.  She was the director of the Théâtre du Gymnase in Paris from 1962 onwards, and this theatre now bears her name.

Early life
Marie Bell was born on 23 December 1900 in Bègles near Bordeaux (France). With her Irish father, she spent her childhood between Bordeaux and England.

Career
Bell was a classical actress. She also appeared in avant-garde theatre, Jean Genet in particular.

Her interpretation of the role of Phèdre is highly noted : "Voir Marie Bell dans Phèdre est une chance unique pour quiconque veut savoir ce qu'est le génie français." André Malraux

During the German Occupation of France (1940–1944), she participated in the French resistance as one of nine directors of the Front national du théâtre. She was awarded the decoration of the Légion d'honneur by President Charles de Gaulle.

Personal life
Bell married Jean Chevrier, who was also an actor.

Death
Bell died on 14 August 1985 in Neuilly-sur-Seine, Hauts-de-Seine, France. She was buried alongside her husband Jean Chevrier at the Monaco Cemetery not far from Josephine Baker.

Filmography 
Paris (dir. René Hervil, 1924), as Marthe de Lignières
Madame Récamier (dir. Tony Lekain and Gaston Ravel, 1928), as Juliette Récamier
 The Farewell Waltz (dir. Henry Roussel, 1928), as Maria Wodzińska
Figaro (dir. Tony Lekain and Gaston Ravel, 1929), as Suzanne
La nuit est à nous (The Night Is Ours) (dir. Carl Froelich and Henry Roussel, 1930), as Bettine de Barsac
Le Joker (dir. Erich Waschneck, 1930), as Harriet Williams
 (dir. Curtis Bernhardt and Jean Tarride, 1931), as Lady Falkland
La Folle Aventure (dir. Carl Froelich and André-Paul Antoine, 1931), as Nelly Irwin
 Luck (dir. René Guissart, 1931), as Tania Balieff
 The Man with the Hispano (dir. Jean Epstein, 1933), as Stéphane Oswill
 (dir. Karl Hartl and Henri-Georges Clouzot, 1934), as Isabelle
Fedora (dir. Louis J. Gasnier, 1934), as Fedora
Le Grand Jeu (dir. Jacques Feyder, 1934), as Florence / Irma
Poliche (dir. Abel Gance, 1934), as Rosine
 (dir. Giovacchino Forzano, 1935), as Anne-Marie de Beaulieu
 (dir. Giovacchino Forzano and Marcel Cravenne, 1936), as Anne-Marie de Beaulieu
 (dir. Abel Gance, 1936), as Marguerite
La Garçonne (dir. Jean de Limur, 1936), as Monique Lerbier – la garçonne
La Tentation (dir. Pierre Caron, 1936), as Irène de Bergue
 (dir. Léo Joannon, 1936), as Mattia
Les Demi-vierges (dir. Pierre Caron, 1936), as Maud de Rouvre
Blanchette (dir. Pierre Caron, 1937), as Blanchette Rousset
 (dir. Walter Kapps, 1937), as Renée Morhange
Un carnet de bal (Life Dances On) (dir. Julien Duvivier, 1937), as Christine Surgère
 (dir. Maurice Gleize, 1938), de Simone
La Glu (dir. Jean Choux, 1938), as Fernande "La Glu"
Noix de coco (Cocoanut) (dir. Jean Boyer, 1939), as Caroline
 The Phantom Carriage (dir. Julien Duvivier, 1939), as Sœur Maria
 (dir. Yvan Noé, 1941), as Hélène
Vie privée (dir. Walter Kapps, 1942), as Florence
Le colonel Chabert (dir. René Le Hénaff, 1943), as Comtesse Rosine Ferraud
Il gattopardo (The Leopard) (dir. Luchino Visconti, 1963), uncredited
La Bonne Soupe (dir. Robert Thomas, 1964), as Marie-Paule
Vaghe stelle dell'Orsa (Sandra) (dir. Luchino Visconti, 1965), as Sandra's mother
Hotel Paradiso (dir. Peter Glenville, 1966), as La Grande Antoinette
Phèdre (dir. Pierre Jourdan, 1968), as Phèdre
Les Volets clos (dir. Jean-Claude Brialy, 1973), as Aurore

References

External links 

 
 
  Marie Bell at Ciné-Ressources (French)
 
 brief biography of Marie Bell

1900 births
1985 deaths
Burials in Monaco
French stage actresses
French silent film actresses
French film actresses
French theatre directors
Place of death missing
Sociétaires of the Comédie-Française
People from Gironde
20th-century French actresses
Monegasque actresses
French Resistance members
French expatriates in Monaco